Mysore Seshaiah Suresh Babu Naidu is an Indian actor, producer, director, and dubbing artist. He has acted predominantly in Tamil and Telugu languages.

Personal life 
Suresh was born in Sri Kalhasthi. His parents were also born in Sri Kalahasthi. His grandfather was from Nellore.

Career 
Suresh started his career as an editing assistant and a dance assistant. One of his father's friends thought that he could become a successful lead actor. Suresh approached director C. V. Sridhar with a portfolio but was turned down. A few years later, Suresh played the lead in three of Sridhar's films. He then met director duo Santhana Bharathi and P. Vasu, who cast him as the lead in Panneer Pushpangal (1981). Suresh was simultaneously offered the lead role in Bharathiraja's Alaigal Oivathillai (1981), which he turned down for the former film. Both films were large commercial successes. He became the prominent face of the Tamil Film Industry, through the 80's era. Suresh played the role of a lover in many films and produced four films and seven television serials before taking a hiatus in the 1990s. During the period he enhanced his career in Telugu cinema.

Suresh made a comeback to Tamil cinema in 2006 with Kizhakku Kadalkarai Salai starring Srikanth. He played supporting roles including in Aasal (2010) alongside Ajith Kumar. In 2012, Suresh appeared in the Tamil-Telugu bilingual film Kadhalil Sodhappuvadhu Yeppadi directed by Balaji Mohan, playing the character of Akilan Venkatesan, who was going through a mid-life crisis. A reviewer for The Hindu called the entire cast "effective".

Suresh has hosted and judged six seasons of the competitive cooking game show Kitchen Superstar for Vijay TV.

As a dubbing / voice-over artist, Suresh was the Tamil voice of the actor Ajith Kumar in Aasai (1995) and for Nagarjuna in Idhayathai Thirudathe (1989), Siva (1989), Ratchagan (1997), Ooty (2012), and Manam (2016).

From 2018 to 2020, he has starred opposite Khushbu Sundar in the bilingual daily serial Lakshmi Stores.

Filmography

Actor

Voice actor 
1990 Udhayam for Nagarjuna (Tamil)
1995 Aasai for Ajith Kumar (Tamil)
1997 Ratchagan for Nagarjuna (Tamil)
1999 Ooty for Ajay Kapoor (Tamil)
2001 Mitr, My Friend for Nasir Abdullah (Telugu)
2018 Nawaab for Arvind Swamy (Telugu)
2019 Manam for Nagarjuna (Tamil)

Producer and director
2002 Raghava (Telugu)

Television

References

External links 
 

Indian male film actors
Male actors in Telugu cinema
Male actors in Tamil cinema
Male actors in Malayalam cinema
1963 births
Living people
Indian male voice actors
Telugu film producers
Male actors from Andhra Pradesh
People from Chittoor district
Film producers from Andhra Pradesh
20th-century Indian male actors
21st-century Indian male actors
Best Child Artist National Film Award winners